Sourashtra College, Madurai, is a general degree college located in Pasumalai, Madurai district, Tamil Nadu. It was established in the year 1967. The college is affiliated with Madurai Kamaraj University. This college offers different courses in arts, commerce and science.

Departments

Science

Physics
Chemistry
Mathematics
Computer Application
Maths
English
Computer science

Arts and Commerce

Tamil
English
Economics
Commerce
Maths

Transportation 
The only public bus to reach the college directly is by 9A. A local bus runs between Anna bus stand and vilachery. Or you have to reach the Mannar Thirumalai Naicker College bus stop from there you can easy access the local bus to Arappalayam Bus Terminus and Mattuthavani Bus Terminus And the only bus to access the munichalai and Vandiyur Mariamman Teppakulam area's is to take the 31A bus which runs between Thirunagar to Anuppanadi.

Accreditation
The college is  recognized by the University Grants Commission (UGC).

References

External links

Educational institutions established in 1967
1967 establishments in Madras State
Colleges affiliated to Madurai Kamaraj University
Colleges in Madurai
Universities and colleges in Madurai district
Universities and colleges in Madurai